McMeniman is a surname. Notable people with the surname include:

Clare McMeniman (born 1985), Australian netball player
Hugh McMeniman (born 1983), Australian rugby union player